HD 4313 b is an extrasolar planet orbiting the K-type star HD 4313 approximately 447 light years away in the constellation Pisces. This planet was discovered using the Doppler spectroscopy (radial velocity) method.

Discovery 
HD 4313 was discovered by a group of scientist at the Keck Observatory on March 17, 2010 using the Doppler spectroscopy method, which is detecting a planet by the star's change in wobbling.

Properties

Orbit 
HD 4313 has an orbital period similar to Earth, with an orbit of approximately, 356 days. Its orbit distance is similar, about 1 AU away from its host star. According to the latest data, this planet has a somewhat eccentric orbit.

Physical characteristics 
HD 4313 has a mass only 92.7% greater than that of Jupiter, but its radius and inclination is unknown, so the true mass and radius can't be studied. A best estimate of the radius is 1.2 times that of Jupiter.

See also
 HD 181342 b
 HD 206610 b
 HD 180902 b
 HD 136418 b
 HD 212771 b

References

External links
 

Exoplanets discovered in 2010
Exoplanets detected by radial velocity
Pisces (constellation)
Giant planets